Devan Lee Seabaugh (born June 27, 1965) is an ambulance company executive who serves in the Georgia House of Representatives. He was elected in a special election to represent the 34th district following the resignation of incumbent Bert Reeves on April 30, 2021, to work for Georgia Tech.

Electoral history

References

Living people
Republican Party members of the Georgia House of Representatives
21st-century American politicians
1965 births